The men's team épée was one of eight fencing events on the fencing at the 1964 Summer Olympics programme. It was the twelfth appearance of the event. The competition was held October 20–21, 1964, with 86 fencers from 18 nations competing.

Results

Round 1

Ties between teams were broken by individual victories (in parentheses), then by touches received.

Championship rounds

Fifth place semifinal

Rosters

Argentina
 Félix Galimi
 Zelmar Casco
 Jesús Taboada
 Francisco Serp

Australia
 Russell Hobby
 John Humphreys
 Imants Terrauds
 Ivan Lund
 Ian Bowditch

Austria
 Udo Birnbaum
 Herbert Polzhuber
 Roland Losert
 Rudolf Trost
 Marcus Leyrer

Colombia
 Emilio Echeverry
 Ernesto Sastre
 Dibier Tamayo
 Humberto Posada

France
 Claude Brodin
 Yves Dreyfus
 Claude Bourquard
 Jack Guittet
 Jacques Brodin

Great Britain
 Bill Hoskyns
 John Pelling
 Peter Jacobs
 Michael Howard
 Allan Jay

Germany
 Franz Rompza
 Max Geuter
 Volkmar Würtz
 Paul Gnaier
 Haakon Stein

Hungary
 Győző Kulcsár
 Zoltán Nemere
 Tamás Gábor
 István Kausz
 Árpád Bárány

Iran
 Houshmand Almasi
 Nasser Madani
 Bizhan Zarnegar
 Shahpour Zarnegar

Italy
 Giuseppe Delfino
 Alberto Pellegrino
 Gianluigi Saccaro
 Gianfranco Paolucci
 Giovanni Battista Breda

Japan
 Toshiaki Araki
 Katsutada Minatoi
 Kazuhiko Tabuchi
 Heizaburo Okawa
 Takeshi Teshima

Lebanon
 Michel Saykali
 Joseph Gemayel
 Hassan El-Said
 Ibrahim Osman

Poland
 Henryk Nielaba
 Mikołaj Pomarnacki
 Bogdan Gonsior
 Bohdan Andrzejewski
 Jerzy Pawłowski

South Korea
 Sin Du-Ho
 Kim Chang-Hwan
 Han Myeong-Seok
 Kim Man-Sig

Soviet Union
 Bruno Habārovs
 Guram Kostava
 Yury Smolyakov
 Grigory Kriss
 Aleksey Nikanchikov

Switzerland
 Claudio Polledri
 Paul Meister
 Walter Bar
 Jean Gontier
 Michel Steininger

Sweden
 Ivar Genesjö
 Orvar Lindwall
 Hans Lagerwall
 Göran Abrahamsson
 Carl-Wilhelm Engdahl

United States
 Paul Pesthy
 Frank Anger
 David Micahnik
 Larry Anastasi

References

Sources
 

Fencing at the 1964 Summer Olympics
Men's events at the 1964 Summer Olympics